Wonjong Rhee is an electrical engineering at ASSIA, Inc. in San Francisco, California. He was named a Fellow of the Institute of Electrical and Electronics Engineers (IEEE) in 2012 for his work on dynamic spectrum management systems.

References

External links

20th-century births
Living people
Academic staff of Seoul National University
Fellow Members of the IEEE
Year of birth missing (living people)
Place of birth missing (living people)